Squad Car is a 1960 American crime drama film directed by Ed Leftwich and starring Vici Raaf, Paul Bryar, Don Marlowe, Jack Harris, and Lynn Moore. The film was released by 20th Century Fox in September 1960.

Plot
A pilot (Reinhart) who owns his own crop dusting business is hired by a counterfeiter (Stahl) to fly counterfeit money from Mexico to the US. Reinhart's mechanic (Taylor) learns of this and secretly takes some of the money and spends it around town, which alerts the Secret Service. The counterfeiter then kills the mechanic to stop him. The local police investigate the murder and eventually link the murder to the counterfeit ring.

Cast
Vici Raaf as Cameo Kincaid
Paul Bryar as Police Lt. Beck (as Paul Byar)
Don Marlowe as Jay Reinhart
Jack Harris as Manfred Stahl
Lynn Moore as Jeanne Haggerty (as Lyn Moore)
Jimmy Cross as Detective Landis (uncredited)
Jimmy Dale as Bank Official (uncredited)
James Hurley as Bartender (uncredited)
Norman MacDonald as Dell Taylor (uncredited)
Patsy Schutter as Extra (uncredited)
Blu Wright as Robert Scalise (uncredited)
Art Gilmore as Narrator (uncredited)

References

External links

1960 crime drama films
American crime drama films
1960 films
American black-and-white films
20th Century Fox films
1960s English-language films
1960s American films